Najib en Julia is a 2003 Dutch television serial in six episodes directed by Theo van Gogh. It won the Golden Calf for Best TV-Drama at the Nederlands Film Festival.

Cast
 Eva van der Gucht as Ellen
 Lisa van Nievelt as Nicolien
 Ingrid Willemse as Zuster
 Hanin Msellek as Najib
 Tara Elders as Julia
 Najib Amhali as Nasr
 Sabri Saad El-Hamus as Kamal
 Achmed Elghazaoui as Achmed
 Thijs Römer as Floris
 Wimie Wilhelm as Lerares
 Cahit Ölmez as Khalid

References

2003 Dutch television series debuts
2000s Dutch television series
Dutch drama television series
Films directed by Theo van Gogh
Dutch television miniseries
2000s television miniseries